Pultenaea baeuerlenii, commonly known as Budawangs bush-pea, is a species of flowering plant in the family Fabaceae and is endemic to a restricted area of New South Wales. It is a small, erect shrub with linear, cylindrical, grooved leaves, and dense groups of yellow and red flowers, sometimes with red markings.

Description

Taxonomy and naming
Pultenaea baeuerlenii was first formally described in 1887 by Ferdinand von Mueller in the Proceedings of the Linnean Society of New South Wales. The specific epithet (baeuerlenii) honours William Baeuerlen who collected the type specimens on Mount Currockbilly "at an elevation of " in the Budawang Range.

Distribution and habitat
Budawangs bush-pea grows in swamp heath on sandstone and is only known from four populations in the Budawang Range.

Conservation status
This pultenaea is classified as "vulnerable" under the Australian Government Environment Protection and Biodiversity Conservation Act 1999 and the New South Wales Government Biodiversity Conservation Act 2016. The main threats to the species include inappropriate fire regimes, understorey clearing and road widening and maintenance.

References

baeuerlenii
Flora of New South Wales
Plants described in 1887
Taxa named by Ferdinand von Mueller